Coleophora chotticola is a moth of the family Coleophoridae. It is found in North Africa.

References

chotticola
Moths described in 1988
Moths of Africa